Mlečice is a municipality and village in Rokycany District in the Plzeň Region of the Czech Republic. It has about 300 inhabitants.

Administrative parts
Villages of Prašný Újezd and Skoupý are administrative parts of Mlečice.

References

Villages in Rokycany District